Mothertime is a 1997 British film directed by Matthew Jacobs.

Plot
Vanessa and her siblings watch, as their divorced mother once again becomes drunk, making the children believe their Christmas will be ruined once again. Some drastic changes must be taken. When their mother is drunk, they take her and lock her in a basement to dry out. So begins a conspiracy to hide her absence from their father and the cleaning lady. The children feed their mother and spend many hours in the basement with her, hence the title Mothertime. The children also spend time with their beloved father and his new wife hoping to spring a new but long lost family whole again. Unfortunately, the manoeuvres are not so easy.

Cast
Kate Maberly as Vanessa
Gina McKee as Caroline
Anthony Andrews as Robin
Imogen Stubbs as Suzie
Sheila Allen as Eileen
Felix Bell as Lot
Rosalind Bennett as Ruby
Faith Brook as Isobel
Megan De Wolf as Sacha
Rosy De Wolf as Amber
Kevin Dyer as Park Supervisor
Stephanie Fayerman as Mrs. Guerney
Georgie Glen as Sister Louise
Germaine Greer as Herself
Sara-Marie Maltha as Ilse
Ghizela Modood as Radio Presenter
Ian Reddington as Bart
Fenella Shepard as Assistant
Zohren Weiss as Dominic

Awards
Won a Gold Award for Theatrical Feature at WorldFest-Flagstaff.

External links
 IMDb Profile
 Kate Maberly's Profile
 Hollywood Profile

1997 films
BBC Television shows
1990s English-language films